Robert P. Ross (born August 29, 1969 in Victoria, British Columbia) is a former Canadian national rugby player.

He would earn 58 caps for Canada, including being named captain twice.

External links 
Scrum.Com

1969 births
Living people
Canadian rugby union players
Sportspeople from Victoria, British Columbia
Canada international rugby union players
Rugby union fly-halves